Martina Pracht (born 11 April 1964) is a Canadian equestrian. She competed in two events at the 1992 Summer Olympics.

She was a daughter and a granddaughter of fellow Olympians, Eva Maria Pracht and Josef Neckermann, respectively.

References

External links
 

1964 births
Living people
Canadian female equestrians
Canadian dressage riders
Olympic equestrians of Canada
Equestrians at the 1992 Summer Olympics
Equestrians at the 1987 Pan American Games
Equestrians at the 1999 Pan American Games
Pan American Games medalists in equestrian
Pan American Games gold medalists for Canada
Pan American Games silver medalists for Canada
Sportspeople from Frankfurt
German emigrants to Canada
Medalists at the 1987 Pan American Games
20th-century Canadian women
21st-century Canadian women